This article lists political parties in Syria.

Everyone is allowed to start a new political party but it cannot be founded on ethnic, religious, regional or tribal basis. Under the Constitution of Syria approved in 2012, a licensed party must have at least 50 founding members, aged 25 or over, who have been Syrian nationals for more than 10 years, and are not members of any other party, Syrian or non-Syrian.

Political parties and organizations

See also
 Politics of Syria
 List of political parties by country

References 

Syria
Political parties
 
Political parties
Syria